The bottom bracket on a bicycle connects the crankset (chainset) to the bicycle and allows the crankset to rotate freely. It contains a spindle to which the crankset attaches, and the bearings that allow the spindle and crankset to rotate. The chainrings and pedals attach to the cranks. Bottom bracket bearings fit inside the bottom bracket shell, which connects the seat tube, down tube and chain stays as part of the bicycle frame.

The term "bracket" refers to the tube fittings that are used to hold frame tubes together in lugged steel frames which also form the shell that contains the spindle and bearings; the term is now used for all frames, bracketed or not.

There is some disagreement as to whether the word axle or spindle should be used in particular contexts. The distinction is based on whether the unit is stationary, as in a hub, or rotates, as in a bottom bracket. American bicycle mechanic and author Sheldon Brown uses axle once and spindle four times in his bottom bracket glossary entry. This article uses spindle throughout for consistency.

An old American term for the bottom bracket is hanger. This is usually used in connection with Ashtabula cranks, alternatively termed one-piece cranks.

Bottom bracket types

Three-piece
In typical modern bikes, the bottom bracket spindle is separate from the cranks. This is known as a three-piece crankset. The cranks attach to the spindle via a common square taper, cotter or splined interface.

Loose bearing
Earlier three-piece cranks consist of a spindle incorporating bearing cones (facing out), a fixed cup on the drive side, an adjustable cup on the non-drive side, and loose bearing balls. Overhauling requires removing at least one cup, cleaning the cups, cleaning or (more usually) replacing the bearing balls, reinstalling the spindle, and adjusting the cups.

Bayliss Wiley Unit Bottom Bracket

The ‘Bayliss Wiley unit bottom bracket’ is a self-contained unit that fits into a plain, slightly larger-than-usual bottom bracket shell in a bicycle frame. It comprises a standard spindle and bearings in a steel cylinder with a slightly-modified bearing cup at each end. The cylinder, bearing and spindle are placed in the shell and held in place by the bearing cups, each of which has a narrow flange that bears against the edge of the shell.

The Bayliss-Wiley Unit Bottom Bracket was introduced in the mid-1940s. It was fitted to various English lightweights through the 1950s and was used by Royal Enfield on its 'Revelation' small wheeler in the mid-1960s. However, the unit bottom bracket was never popular and it had a reputation for being troublesome. A lack of positive location allowed it to rotate within the frame, loosening the bearing cups. Contemporary users overcome the problem by fixing the unit in the frame using adhesive or a screw.

Cartridge bearing
Many modern bicycles use what is called a "cartridge" bottom bracket instead. Sealed cartridge bottom brackets are normally two pieces, a unit holding the spindle and bearings that screws into the bottom bracket shell from the drive side and a screw-in support cup (often made of light alloy or plastic) that supports the spindle and bearing assembly on the non-drive side. Other designs are three piece, the spindle is separate, but the bearing cups incorporate cheaply replaceable standard cartridge bearing units. Either arrangement makes servicing the bottom bracket a simple matter of removing the old cartridge from the bottom bracket shell, and installing a new one in its place. Cartridge bottom brackets generally have seals to prevent the ingress of water and dirt. The early Shimano LP bottom brackets from the 1990s had the support cup on the drive side and used loose bearings inside; they could be dismantled and serviced much like cup and cone bearings.

In general use, the term 'three piece' refers to the former design, with sealed bottom brackets being seen as the 'standard'. Designs utilizing separate bearings are usually found on low end bikes, due to the low cost.

One-piece (Ashtabula)

With a one-piece (also called Ashtabula) crank and bottom bracket, the spindle and crank arms are a single piece. The bottom bracket shell is large to accommodate removal of this S-shaped crank.  Bearing cups are pressed into the bottom bracket shell.  The crank holds the cones, facing in; adjustment is made via the left-threaded non-drive side cone.

One-piece cranks are easily maintained and reliable, but heavy.  They are found on BMX bikes as well as children's bicycles and low-end road and mountain bikes. They fit only frames with American sized (also known as "Pro size") bottom brackets.

The bearings are normally open to the elements and easily contaminated, although this rarely causes failure.  Ball retainers (caged bearings) are used to facilitate assembly and to reduce the number of balls required.

Thompson
The Thompson bottom bracket uses adjustable spindle cones and cups pressed into the bottom bracket shell like the Ashtabula bottom bracket.    Unlike the Ashtabula crank, the non-drive side crank is removable, allowing for a smaller bottom bracket shell. Frames with either Italian or English bottom bracket shell diameters (independent of threading) may be fitted with Thompson bottom brackets.  Thompson bottom brackets are rare.  The design is similar to a typical hub bearing and theoretically supports the load better but is hard to seal effectively against dirt and water.

External bearings
Many current designs are now using an integrated bottom bracket with outboard bearings. This is an attempt to address several issues associated with weight and stiffness. Because of the relatively small 1.37" (34.9 mm for ISO, or 36 mm for shells threaded to the Italian standard) diameter shell, designs that place the bearings inside the shell can either have large bearings and a thinner spindle, which lacks stiffness, or smaller bearings and a thicker spindle (such as the original Shimano Octalink), which lacks durability. External bearings allow for a large diameter (hence stiff) and hollow (hence light) spindle. They also offer more distance between the two bearing surfaces, which contributes to stiffness while allowing lighter components. A different approach would be to standardize on the larger BMX shell for all bicycles, or the BB30 standard originally introduced by Cannondale.

Several implementations of external bearings have been brought to market.

X-type and Hollowtech II
In one design, the driveside (right) crankarm and the bottom bracket spindle are an integrated unit and the bearings are placed outside of the bottom bracket shell. There are a number of versions of this design available: Shimano's Hollowtech II, RaceFace's X-type, FSA's MegaExo. The terms 'X-Type' and 'Hollowtech II' are both used to refer to any design of this type, but are in fact trademarks of the corporations marketing the systems. These external bearings are compatible with those from other manufacturers. With this new standard have come several cranksets designed to use the external bearings of other manufacturers, such as DMR's "Ex type" and Charge Bikes "Regular" cranks.

In the early 1990s and Magic Motorcycle, a small USA component manufacturer later purchased by Cannondale, and re-formed into Cannondale's CODA brand (Coda Magic 900 cranks), made a proprietary external bearing bottom bracket, oversized spindle and crank system. The design resembles the external bottom bracket designs marketed by FSA, RaceFace and Shimano. The modern versions use the same bearing size (6805-RS) and the original mounting tool fits. The crank had intricately CNC machined wide hollow crank arms made of two halves glued together. However, Cannondale moved on and developed the SI cranks and the new BB30 bottom bracket standard. Their special frames have a larger bottom bracket shell allowing use of internal bearings while their top level SI crankarms are still two machined aluminum halves glued together.

Another precursor of the current external bearings/through spindle design was developed by Sweet Parts, a micro-manufacturer of high end cranks and stems. Their Sweet Wings cranks from the early 1990s incorporated the through spindle concept by attaching the two half pipes coming off each crank arm and held together with a single bolt that resided within the cavity of the spindle itself. Their bottom bracket bearing arrangement was a "hybrid" - the right side was internal while the left side was external (and had the 6805-RS sealed bearing, too).

Giga-X-Pipe

Truvativ's approach is an evolution of the ISIS Drive bottom bracket. The spindle is made longer, and the bearings sit outside the bottom bracket shell.  The spindle is permanently pressed into the right crank. The left side spline interface looks similar, but is different so as to prevent installation of older ISIS Drive crankarms—which are no longer compatible because Q-factor and chain line cannot be maintained using these older cranks with an external bearing BB. They refer to this design as 'Giga-X-Pipe' or 'GXP.' They also make a heavier duty external bearing bottom bracket called 'Howitzer.' The Howitzer BB is more like a traditional BB in that the spindle is not permanently pressed into the right crank.  Again, the Howitzer spline looks similar to the ISIS Drive standard spline but is actually different, so as to prevent the usage of ISIS Drive cranks on the external bearing BB, which would affect chainline and Q-factor.

Ultra-Torque

In late 2006, Campagnolo introduced an outboard bearing design called Ultra-Torque, which has both crank arms permanently attached to halves of the spindle (called semi-axles), which then join in the middle of the bottom bracket with a Hirth joint and a bolt.

Pressed Bearing Standards
Bicycle frames utilizing pressed bearing standards do not have any threads inside the bottom bracket shell.  The bottom bracket is pressed directly into the frame. Using pressed in standards allows frame manufacturers greater flexibility in the frame design that many times offers greater stiffness and weight reductions, however many users are reporting creaking issues with these systems.  The current pressed-bearing standards (and developed by) are:  BB30 (Cannondale), PF30 (SRAM), BB90 & BB95 (Trek), BB86 & BB92 (Shimano), BB79 (Cervelo’s BBRight), and BB386EVO (FSA and BH bicycles).  In BB30, BB90 & BB95 systems: the bearings are pressed directly into the frame.  For PF30, BB86 & BB92, BB79, and BB386EVO; the bearing is housed in a nylon plastic cup that is pressed into the frame’s bottom bracket shell.  Pressed in standards usually require two-piece cranksets where the spindle is attached to one of the crankarms.  Due to fixed spindle length and diameter, crank sets designed for one pressed standard may not be compatible with another.  For example, a crankset made specifically for BB30 will not fit in a BB86 bottom bracket and frame.  There are other instances where adapters can be used to fit a crankset made for one standard into another.  For example, a Shimano (two piece Hollowtech II 24mm OD spindle) road crankset can fit into a BB30 bottom bracket shell (42mm ID) using aftermarket adapters.

Other
Lightning Cycle Dynamics, Inc. offers a carbon crank bottom bracket assembly with semi-axles that connect in the middle via a hirth-like joint to form the spindle.

Schlumpf makes a bottom bracket that incorporates a two-speed epicyclic transmission.

Interface types

As well as the different means to fit the bottom bracket into the frame, there are a number of ways of connecting the crank arms to the bottom bracket spindle. Shimano introduced a proprietary splined interface named "Octalink". Several other manufacturers (King Cycle Group, Truvativ, and Race Face) created an "open" standard called "ISIS Drive" or simply "ISIS", for International Splined Interface Standard.

Cottered
One of the earliest standards of crank interface, cottered cranks are now considered obsolete in Western countries, but are still in common use in China, India and other developing nations. The spindle is a cylinder and has a flat region across it (a land). The crank has a hole through it to fit onto the spindle, with a transverse hole for the cotter pin. The cotter pin is cylindrical with one side flattened at an angle to form a wedge to match the spindle land. When tightened, this produces a simple and effective interface.  The problem is that normally the interface cannot be tightened enough without a cotter press, a highly specialized tool, though still produced and for sale.  Cotters can also be installed with an improvised tool designed for another purpose, such as a ball joint splitter or hammer, with mixed results.

Because all the load is on one very small area of the cotter pin and the crank land the cotter pin deforms plastically under normal use and so must be replaced regularly. If this is not done the crank and the spindle wear and must be replaced. There is a warning because of a characteristic creak sound that aging pins cause the cranks to make.

Square taper

Often referred to as 'cotterless', since this was the design that was introduced after cottered spindles, square taper was once the most popular (and only) style 'cotterless' crank. This interface consists of a spindle with square tapered ends that fit into square tapered holes in each crank. It is still manufactured in great numbers for bicycles and maintains popularity for such applications as bicycles.

Not all square taper crank and bottom bracket combinations are compatible. Although nearly all spindles use a 2-degree taper, there are two competing standards, defined by the measurement across the flat at the end of the spindle. The JIS size is used by Shimano and most other Asian manufacturers. The ISO size is primarily used by Campagnolo and other European manufacturers, in addition to cranks that adhere to the NJS standards (Sugino 75). Some manufacturers make cranks and bottom brackets to both specifications.

Some square tapered bottom bracket axles are threaded at the ends and use nuts.  Other square tapered bottom brackets are hollow, allowing for crank bolts to thread into the ends.

Titanium has been used in an effort to make bottom brackets lighter, but early attempts were not entirely successful. Several manufacturers have built bottom brackets with titanium spindles and alloy cups but their durability was lower than that of steel. Early Campagnolo Super Record titanium spindles (which were hollow) were replaced by a later version that used solid, nutted spindles for improved reliability.

In recent years Shimano has migrated much of their product line away from square taper to a spline attachment called Octalink and to external bearing types. In late 2006, Campagnolo announced that it was abandoning the square taper interface for double chainsets in favor of an outboard bearing design called Ultra-Torque, which uses a splined interface between spindle halves.

Splined
Several different competing standards for splined interfaces exist. The tool for installing and removing these bottom brackets is often also a spline.

Octalink

The Octalink system uses a spindle with eight splines. The splines provide a contact area between crank and spindle for an interface.  Octalink exists in the marketplace in two variants, Octalink v1, and Octalink v2.  The difference between the two can be seen by the depth of mounting grooves on the bottom bracket spindle.   V1 spline grooves are 5 mm long, while V2 grooves are 9mm long. Shimano 105, Ultegra 6500 and Dura Ace 7700 cranksets mate to version one bottom brackets, while later mountain bike designs use the deeper-grooved version two.  The system is proprietary and protected by Shimano patents and license fees.

ISIS Drive
ISIS Drive, the International Splined Interface Standard, is a non-proprietary splined specification for the interface between a bicycle crankset and the bottom bracket spindle. It was created by King Cycle Group, Truvativ, and Race Face. ISIS Drive is open source and free to the public to be used as seen fit.

Other designs
BMX 3-Piece bottom brackets typically use a spindle either 19(.05)mm (3/4") or 22 mm in diameter. In some cases, these are splined and the number of splines depends on the manufacturer/model of the crankset, or in other cases, the spindle is specific to the crankset.

There are other designs in use that have varying degrees of popularity. One is Truvativ's Power Spline interface. It is a 12 spline spindle proprietary to Truvativ offered as a lower cost alternative to other spline designs.  It is essentially a beefed-up square taper spindle with splines instead of tapers.

Phil Wood uses a similar splined design to the Shimano bottom bracket. The difference is an 18-tooth versus a 20-tooth as per the Shimano design.

Sizes
Bottom brackets have several key size parameters: spindle length, shell width, and shell diameter.

Shell width and spindle length

There are a few standard shell widths. Road bikes usually use ; Italian road bikes use ; Early model mountain bikes use . Later models (1995 and newer) use  more commonly. Some downhill bikes even use an  bottom bracket shell. Snow bikes use a  shell.

Spindles come in a wider range of lengths, and are sized to match not only the shell width but also the type of crankset it will support (longer for triple, shorter for single, etc.). Spindle length, along with the crank's shape, determines the Q factor or tread.

Shell diameters and threading
There are a few standard shell diameters with associated thread pitches (24–28 tpi).

Most (except for Italian and French) designs use right-hand (normal) threading for the left side and left-hand (reverse) threading for the right (drive) side. This is opposite of most pedal threading and is done for the same reason: to keep the bottom bracket cup from backing out of the bottom bracket shell due to precession.

With the development of external bearing designs, the standard shell diameter has become a considerable constraint, limiting both the diameter of the bottom bracket spindle and the size of the actual bearing balls in the races. Consequently, these external bearing designs can be less durable than older internal bearing designs. To address this problem several designers have promoted new standards for larger diameter bottom bracket shells, the best known of which is BB30 promoted by Cannondale. The name BB30 refers to the  diameter of the spindle, not of the shell. Most of these larger diameter designs are using bearings that are pressed in. Since about 2015 there is now a T47 standard with a larger shell diameter and also threading. Some manufacturers (like Trek) are starting to implement this into their bicycles, while it is also possible to have threading cut into an existing 46mm pressfit and have T47 cups fit in there.

Bottom bracket height

The bottom bracket height is the vertical distance from the center of the bottom bracket to the ground, and it expresses clearance of the frame over obstacles.  The height of the bottom bracket is of concern when designing the frame.  The height of the bottom bracket is the baseline for the rider's height while riding.  Combined with the length of the cranks, it determines the bicycle's ground clearance.

A higher bottom bracket is useful for mountain bikes. In a fixed-gear bicycle, the bottom bracket should be high enough to prevent the pedals from coming in contact with the ground while cornering but is not always achieved.

A lower bottom bracket creates a lower center of gravity and allows for a larger frame without creating an uncomfortable standover height.

Eccentric bottom brackets
An eccentric is a cylindrical plug or bearing cup that fits into an enlarged bottom bracket shell.  The plug is machined to accept a typical bottom bracket, but offset from the center of the plug, so that by rotating the plug, the location of the bottom bracket (and hence the chain tension) may be adjusted (fore and aft to tension the chain, the upper or lower eccentric position for a given chain length can be chosen to fine tune bottom bracket height). Once properly adjusted the plug is then fixed in place by a pair of set screws, a clamping bottom bracket shell, an expanding wedge in the plug, or the plug may be manufactured in left and right halves that clamp against the faces of the bottom bracket shell with screws that connect the two halves.

Eccentric bottom bracket shell inner diameters vary between manufacturers from 42mm-55mm (nominally).

Eccentrics are used in applications that require precise chain tension adjustment such as the timing chain of tandem bicycles, the chain that connects the stoker's and captain's cranks. They may also be employed on bicycles that do not have an adjustable rear wheel position, due to vertical dropouts or a rear disc brake, and that do not have an external rear derailleur such as single-speeds or bikes with an internal-geared hub.

Compatibility issues 
The bottom bracket shell and bottom bracket assembly as a whole have changed drastically as bike frames and part manufacturing continues to evolve. While the progression in technology is great for the consumer, it has proven to play a challenging role in frame design and aftermarket parts. Around 2001, Shimano was manufacturing proprietary bottom bracket components with patents. Bike frame manufacturers would then create bikes with the patented bottom brackets as a guiding light around the shell area. This caused aftermarket brands to struggle in creating a bottom bracket that would fit into bikes that came with OEM Shimano parts. Companies such as RaceFace, Chris King, and Truvativ (SRAM Corporation) sat down in 1998 and collaborated on a standard bottom bracket specification. In August 2001, the ISIS Drive Standard was published and made into open source for anyone to create products using the designated specifications. Frame manufacturers took to the idea and created bikes that accepted the standard, allowing for a broader market. This success would prove to be short-lived due to failures and need for the industry to continue progressing and creating better specifications. Now in 2019, Shimano creates non-proprietary as well as proprietary bottom bracket designs such as HollowTech II and BBR60. Many "non OEM" part manufacturers have created bottom bracket conversion kits, giving consumers the ability to install crank sets designed for one standard into another (Example BB/PF30 cranks into a 22/24mm spindle).

References

Standards
ISO 6695: Cycles – Pedal axle and crank assembly with square end fittings – Assembly dimensions. International Organization for Standardization, Geneva, 1991. (also: British Standard BS 6102-14)
ISO 6696: Cycles – Screw threads used in bottom bracket assemblies. 1989. (also: British Standard BS 6102-9)
ISIS drive

External links

Bottom Bracket Size Database by Sheldon Brown
How to fit a bottom bracket by Ceramic Speed

Bicycle drivetrains